Imtikümzük Longkümer (21 January 1967 – 22 September 2018) was an Indian politician from Nagaland. He was a deputy Speaker of the Legislative Assembly of Nagaland. He was a member of the Naga People's Front. Imtikümzük was a member of the Nagaland Legislative Assembly from the Aonglenden constituency in Mokokchung district. He served in the Legislative Assembly from 2013 until his death in 2018.

References 

1967 births
2018 deaths
Naga people
Indian National Congress politicians from Nagaland
Naga People's Front politicians
Nagaland MLAs 2013–2018
Nationalist Democratic Progressive Party politicians
Nagaland MLAs 2018–2023
People from Mokokchung district